Gavineh Rud (also Romanized as Gāvīneh Rūd; also known as Kavan Rūd and Kāvīneh Rūd) is a village in Barvanan-e Sharqi Rural District, Torkamanchay District, Meyaneh County, East Azerbaijan Province, Iran. At the 2006 census, its population was 415, in 85 families.

References 

Populated places in Meyaneh County